Who's the Boss? is the debut album by rapper Antoinette. It was released in 1989 through Next Plateau Entertainment. The production was by I.G. Off, Jay Ellis, and the Ultramagnetic MCs.

The album peaked at No. 47 on the Top R&B Albums chart. The single, also titled Who The Boss, peaked at #17 on the Billboard Hot Rap Songs.

The album has gained New York-based rapper Antoinette “the gangstress” praise from many legendary rap acts such as Rakim, Yo - Yo, and Salt n Pepa’s Spinderella for its lyrical agility and raw vocals. 

Although most do not see Antoinette outside of her feud with rapper “MC Lyte” in 1989, urbanly, Antoinette is recognized as one who wasn’t afraid to back down against a bigger rapper with better backing than herself. She is praised for her chill, deep vocals and delivery, especially on cuts like “I Got An Attitude” & “Who’s The Boss”.

Track listing
"Shake, Rattle & Roll" - 4:39 
"Go For What You Know" - 3:33 
"Who's the Boss" - 3:25 
"Watch the Gangstress Boogie" - 4:30 
"This Girl is Off on Her Own" - 3:22 
"Here She Comes" - 2:29 
"Lights Out, Party's Over" - 3:36 
"I'm Crying" - 3:54 
"The Gangstress" - 3:53 
"A is for Antoinette" - 3:16 
"Baby Make it Boom" - 3:37

References

1989 debut albums
Antoinette (rapper) albums